Mario Mitaj (born 6 August 2003) is a professional footballer who plays as a left-back for Russian Premier League club Lokomotiv Moscow. Born in Greece, he represents Albania at international level.

Club career

AEK Athens
On 12 August 2020, Mitaj signed his first professional contract with Greek club AEK Athens and immediately started training with the first team.

On 18 October 2020, he made his first league appearance in a game against PAOK, thus becoming the youngest foreign player in club history to feature in a competitive fixture, at 17 years, 2 months and 13 days old.

On 2 February 2021, he signed a new contract, running until the summer of 2023.

On 10 August 2021, the Albanian defender signed a new deal, keeping him at the club until the summer of 2026.

Lokomotiv Moscow
On 27 August 2022, Mitaj signed a five-year contract with Russian Premier League club FC Lokomotiv Moscow. The transfer fee was 3 million euros and AEK also kept a percentage for the next Mitaj's transfer.

International career 
Having lived in Nea Ionia, Attica, Greece for a large part of his life, Mitaj was eligible to represent both Albania and Greece at international level. After having featured in all young Albanian squads, he earned his first cap for Albania's senior squad on 31 March 2021, in a 2–0 victory over San Marino for the 2022 European FIFA World Cup qualifiers, becoming cap-tied to Albania in the process. With this appearance, he became Albania's youngest ever international player at 17 years and 237 days old.

Career statistics

References

External links

2003 births
Greek people of Albanian descent
Footballers from Athens
Living people
Greek footballers
Albanian footballers
Albania youth international footballers
Albania under-21 international footballers
Albania international footballers
Association football defenders
AEK Athens F.C. players
AEK Athens F.C. B players
FC Lokomotiv Moscow players
Super League Greece players
Super League Greece 2 players
Russian Premier League players
Albanian expatriate footballers
Expatriate footballers in Russia
Albanian expatriate sportspeople in Russia